Salt War may refer to:

Salt War (1304), between Venice and Padua
War of Ferrara (1482–1484), also called the Salt War, between Venice and Ferrara
Salt War (1540), between Perugia and the Papal States
, between Naples and the Papal States
, a series of rebellions in the Duchy of Savoy
San Elizario Salt War (1877–1878), a range war in the United States